Milaine Thériault (born November 14, 1973 in Saint-Quentin, New Brunswick) is a retired Canadian cross-country skier.

In February, 2004 Thériault won her second consecutive women's five km free technique at the Haywood NorAm Canada Cup competition in Kelowna, British Columbia

Cross-country skiing results
All results are sourced from the International Ski Federation (FIS).

Olympic Games

World Championships

a.  Cancelled due to extremely cold weather.

World Cup

Season standings

Team podiums
 1 podium

References

External links 
 Canoe article
 CBC Athlete Bio

Olympic cross-country skiers of Canada
1973 births
Living people
Canadian female cross-country skiers
Sportspeople from New Brunswick
New Brunswick Sports Hall of Fame inductees
Athabasca University alumni
Cross-country skiers at the 1998 Winter Olympics
Cross-country skiers at the 2002 Winter Olympics
Cross-country skiers at the 2006 Winter Olympics